Nauman Ali (born 7 October 1986) is a Pakistani cricketer. He was born in Khipro, a subdivision of Sanghar, Sindh. He made his debut for the Pakistan cricket team in January 2021.

Early life and family
Nauman Ali was born in Khipro, a small city in a subdivision of the Sanghar District, Sindh to a Punjabi family having roots in Attock District. His uncle, Rizwan Ahmed, also played internationally for Pakistan, was crucial in the development of Nauman as a cricketer.

He holds a bachelor's in commerce from Latifabad.

Career
He was the leading wicket-taker for Khan Research Laboratories in the 2018–19 Quaid-e-Azam One Day Cup, with seventeen dismissals in nine matches. He was also the leading wicket-taker for Khan Research Laboratories in the 2018–19 Quaid-e-Azam Trophy, with 43 dismissals in eight matches. In March 2019, he was named in Sindh's squad for the 2019 Pakistan Cup.

In September 2019, he was named in Northern's squad for the 2019–20 Quaid-e-Azam Trophy tournament. He was the leading wicket-taker in the tournament, with 54 dismissals in ten matches. In January 2021, he was named in Northern's squad for the 2020–21 Pakistan Cup.

In January 2021, he was named in Pakistan's Test squad for their series against South Africa. He made his Test debut for Pakistan, against South Africa, on 26 January 2021. This made him the fourth oldest Test debutant for Pakistan. He took his first wicket in international cricket, that of South Africa captain Quinton de Kock on 26 January 2021. In the second innings, he took 5 for 35, to become the 12th bowler for Pakistan to take a five-wicket haul on debut in Test cricket.

In March 2021 he was picked for his first overseas series, against Zimbabwe. In the second Test, Nauman scored 97 contributing to an 169-run partnership with Abid Ali.

References

External links
 

1986 births
Living people
Pakistani cricketers
Pakistan Test cricketers
Cricketers who have taken five wickets on Test debut
Hyderabad (Pakistan) cricketers
Khan Research Laboratories cricketers
Multan Sultans cricketers
People from Sanghar District
Punjabi people